The 1931 Cork Senior Football Championship was the 43rd staging of the Cork Senior Football Championship since its establishment by the Cork County Board in 1887. 

Macroom entered the championship as the defending champions.

On 4 October 1931, Macroom won the championship following a 2-06 to 2-02 defeat of Carbery in the final. This was their 7th championship title overall and their second title in succession.

Results

Final

References

Cork Senior Football Championship